The Soyuz GVK is a Russian uncrewed cargo spacecraft currently under development. Its first flight was expected to occur in 2022, this however has not happened. Like the uncrewed Progress cargo spacecraft, the Soyuz GVK is based on the crewed Soyuz spacecraft. However, the Soyuz GVK will be capable of returning to Earth and bringing cargo back whereas the Progress burns up in Earth's atmosphere upon the end of its mission. The only other resupply spacecraft capable of bringing cargo down from orbit is the SpaceX Dragon 2 cargo spacecraft. Soyuz GVK will be able to deliver 2,000 kg to orbit and return 500 kg back to Earth.

It is planned to launch on board a Soyuz 2.1b booster.

References

Cargo spacecraft
Supply vehicles for the International Space Station
Crewed space program of Russia